Giacomo Marini (born 1951 in Cugnoli, Province of Pescara, Italy) is founder and Managing Director at Noventi, an early-stage technology venture capital firm, based in Silicon Valley. From 2013 to 2017 he was Chairman and CEO of Neato Robotics, a home robot company until its acquisition by Vorwerk.

Career 

In 1981, Marini co-founded Logitech (Nasdaq: LOGI) with Daniel Borel and Pierluigi Zappacosta. He was with the company until 1992 as a board member and member of the management team launching Logitech. He served most recently as Executive VP, Chief Operating Officer. Earlier, he was Executive Vice President, Engineering and Operations; and Vice President of Engineering. 

Prior to Logitech, he held technical and managerial positions with Olivetti and IBM.

From 1993 to 1995 Marini was President and CEO of No Hands Software (later known as Common Ground Software). No Hands Software created one of the first electronic publishing software, in the style of, and competitive to Adobe Acrobat. From 1998 to 1999, Marini served as interim Chief Executive Officer of FutureTel, a digital video encoders company.

Marini is Board Member of PCTEL and of NextLabs. Previously he was Chairman of Velomat from 2012 and 2020 until its acquisition by Sacmi, Chairman of Neato Robotics from 2006 to 2018 until its acquisition by Vorwerk, Chairman of Teknema, an Internet appliances company, director of Aurora Algae, Bitfone, Minerva Networks, Sygate and Silicon Valley Advisor for CDB Web Tech, a venture capital fund of funds.

Marini is a former Board Member of NIAF, the National Italian American Foundation and a former member of the Board of Trustees of the University of California, Davis Foundation.

Personal life
He holds a Laurea Degree, cum laude, in Computer Science from the University of Pisa, Italy.

Marini lives in Northern California with his wife, Ellen Jamason, and daughter Serena.

External links 
 Logitech
 Noventi Ventures
 Neato Robotics
 NIAF National Italian American Foundation
 University of California Davis Foundation

References 

1951 births
Living people
People from the Province of Pescara
American financial businesspeople
Italian chief executives
Venture capitalists
American technology chief executives
Chief operating officers
University of Pisa alumni